= Ostanes pristis =

Scientific classification
- Kingdom: Animalia
- Phylum: Arthropoda
- Subphylum: Chelicerata
- Class: Arachnida
- Order: Araneae
- Infraorder: Araneomorphae
- Family: Thomisidae
- Genus: Ostanes; Simon, 1895
- Species: O. pristis

Binomial name
- Ostanes pristis Simon, 1895

Species of spider

Ostanes pristis is a species of spiders in the family Thomisidae. It was first described in 1895 by Simon. As of 2017, it is the sole species in the genus Ostanes. It is found in west Africa.
